An accommodation platform is an offshore platform which supports living quarters for offshore personnel. These are often associated with the petroleum industry, although other industries use them as well, such as the wind farm Horns Rev 2.

In the oil and gas industry an accommodation platform may be a flotel, providing living quarters for personnel temporarily engaged in construction or maintenance activities. It also refers to a permanent platform bridge-linked to production and wellhead platforms. It provides living quarters and a safe refuge remote from the potential hazards of the hydrocarbon plant.

Accommodation platforms may be designated 'A' (Accommodation), 'LQ' (Living Quarters), 'Q' (Quarters), 'UQ' (Utility & Quarters). Only low hazard equipment and fluids are located on the accommodation platform to reduce the risk of fire or explosion.

Accommodation platforms may comprise:

 Sleeping quarters
Galley
 Eating (mess) facilities
 Food storage
Laundry facilities
 Recreation facilities
 Installation control room
 Crew offices
 Boot/Locker room
 Heating, Ventilation and Air Conditioning (HVAC) systems
Fire and gas detection
 Helideck
Lifeboats
 Emergency power generation
 Firewater (seawater lift) pump(s)
 Instrument and plant air compression
 Potable water plant
Aviation fuel storage
 Sewage treatment and disposal

See also
 Deep sea habitat

References

Petroleum production
Oil platforms